The Western Australia Australian rules football team is the state representative side of Western Australia in the sport of Australian rules football.

Western Australia has a proud history in interstate football, having a successful historical record and winning three Australian Championships and a State of Origin Carnival Championship, in the State of Origin era.

Western Australia has a long and intense rivalry with Victoria. The 1986 game between Western Australia and Victoria is "regarded by many people as one of the greatest games – not just in State of Origin – but in the 150 years of Australian Football".

The team has been known as the "Black Swans" after the Black swan which is the state symbol emblazoned on their guernsey, however they are more popularly known as the "Sandgropers" after the West Australian insect, a nickname also more generally used for West Australians.

History

Western Australia played several interstate matches annually from 1904 until when State of Origin ended in 1999. Western Australia has participated in every Australian National Football Carnival, and always in section 1 when there were divisions. Throughout the majority of the team's history its players came from the West Australian Football League. Between 1977 and 1999 West Australian players in the Victorian Football League played State of Origin football for the Sandgropers.

Western Australia has won three State of Origin Carnival championships. The 1980s were Western Australia's most successful period, winning the Australian Championship three times.

Western Australia won the historic first State of Origin game against Victoria in 1977 by 94 points. This game was a significant endorsement of the concept as a Victorian team had defeated the West Australian team under the previous selection rules by 64 points in the same year.

Rivalries

Victoria
Although Western Australia has a very strong rivalry with South Australia, the rivalry with Victoria is the state's strongest. Western Australia's rivalry stems from dislike coming from a number of reasons, like a feeling in Western Australia that Victoria never gave them the credit they deserve, despite some of the best players of all time coming from the state.

Some games widely regarded as some of the best in the history of Australian football were played between Western Australia and Victoria in the 1980s.  Some include the games in 1986 and 1984, which were high scoring, with multiple high goal scorers.

Leigh Matthews in a game against Western Australia knocked out Barry Cable with a high hit, at Subiaco Oval.  The incident caused an enormous amount of angst in Western Australia.

The entire Western Australian team that won the 1961 Interstate Carnival was inducted into the Western Australian Hall of Champions, because they won a breakthrough carnival, which had been dominated by Victoria.

South Australia
Western Australia has an intense rivalry with South Australia.

Carnival history

1908: 2nd
1911: 4th
1914: 3rd
1921: 1st
1924: 2nd
1927: 2nd
1930: 3rd
1933: 3rd
1937: 2nd
1947: 2nd
1950: 3rd
1953: 3rd
1956: 2nd
1958: 2nd
1961: 1st
1966: 2nd
1969: 3rd
1972: 2nd
1975: 4th
1979: 1st
1980: 3rd
1988: 4th, Section 1
1993: 3rd, Section 1

AFL Under-18/Under-19 Championships

 
5: 1985, 1999, 2007, 2009, 2019

Simpson and Moss Medals
The best player for Western Australia is awarded the Simpson Medal. The medal has been awarded since 1946. Between 1995 and 1998 the Graham Moss Medal was awarded to the best player from a Western Australian team.

List of representatives

References

Australian rules football in Western Australia
Australian rules football representative teams
Australian rules interstate football
Australian rules